Philips Sport Vereniging is a professional football club that is based in Eindhoven, Netherlands, and plays in the Eredivisie. The club was formed in 1913 and started out as a works team for Philips employees. 
PSV is the second most successful club in Dutch Football, next to archrivals Ajax, having won 21 Eredivisie titles, 9 KNVB Cups and 8 Supercups. In Europe, PSV won the 1977–78 UEFA Cup and the 1987–88 European Cup. PSV players who have played more than 100 league matches for the club are listed below.

Willy van der Kuijlen currently holds the record for the most league appearances and the most league goals. He played 528 matches and scored 308 goals between 1964 and 1981. Willy van de Kerkhof played the second-highest amount of league matches for PSV; he appeared in 418 Eredivisie fixtures. The second-highest goal scorer for PSV is Coen Dillen, with 288 goals.

List of players 

Appearances and goals are for first-team league matches only, including both the Netherlands Football League Championship and Eredivisie.
Players are listed according to the date of their first team debut for the club.

Statistics correct as of 5 August 2013.

Table headers
 Nationality – If a player played international football, the country/countries he played for are shown. Otherwise, the player's nationality is given as their country of birth.
 PSV career – The year of the player's first appearance for PSV Eindhoven to the year of his last appearance.
 Appearances – The number of games played.
 Goals – The number of goals scored.

 missing some games

PSV players participating in international cups

References

PSV Eindhoven
PSV Eindhoven players
Association football player non-biographical articles
PSV